Chromiec may refer to the following places in Poland:
Chromiec, Lower Silesian Voivodeship (south-west Poland)
Chromiec, Greater Poland Voivodeship (west-central Poland)